Did I Shave My Back for This? is the third album from country music parodist Cledus T. Judd.  The title of the album itself is a take-off on Deana Carter's 1996 debut album Did I Shave My Legs for This?, whose title track is parodied here. As with his previous two albums for Razor & Tie, this album produced no chart singles for him.

Track listing
"Wives Do It All the Time" – 2:54
parody of "Guys Do It All the Time" by Mindy McCready
"First Redneck on the Internet" – 3:41
original song
feat. Buck Owens
"Every Light in the House Is Blown" – 2:58
parody of "Every Light in the House" by Trace Adkins
"Third Rock from Her Thumb" – 2:54
parody of "Third Rock from the Sun" by Joe Diffie
"Mindy McCready" – 2:37
parody of "Little Bitty" by Alan Jackson
"Did I Shave My Back for This?" – 3:13
parody of "Did I Shave My Legs for This?" by Deana Carter
"Hankenstein" – 3:53
original song
"Hip Hop & Honky Tonk" – 2:44
original song
"Psychic to the Stars" – 2:52
original song
"Cledus Don't Stop Eatin' for Nuthin'" – 3:30
parody of "Mama Don't Get Dressed Up for Nothing" by Brooks & Dunn

Music videos
"Wives Do It All The Time", Cledus plays both the husband and wife, and has a surprise ending by Vince Gill.
"First Redneck on the Internet", features Buck Owens on a Multi Jumbo-tron Television set.
"Every Light in the House Is Blown", features special appearance by Trace Adkins.
"Did I Shave My Back for This?", features an appearance by Deana Carter.

Charts

Weekly charts

Year-end charts

References

1998 albums
Cledus T. Judd albums
Razor & Tie albums
1990s comedy albums